The Albany-Corvallis-Lebanon, Oregon Combined Statistical Area (CSA) is a combined statistical area consisting of Oregon's Benton and Linn counties. Benton County is designated as the Corvallis metropolitan statistical area and Linn County is designated as the Albany-Lebanon micropolitan statistical area.

See also
 Oregon statistical areas

Metropolitan areas of Oregon
Combined statistical areas of the United States